In 1989, the British Lions toured Australia for the first time since 1971. Unlike previous tours to Australia, the Lions did not play any matches in New Zealand, this being the first Australia-only tour since 1899. The side was captained by Finlay Calder.

The Lions suffered a 30–12 defeat in the first test in Sydney on 1 July, then their heaviest defeat by Australia. In this first test, Australia scored four tries, and flyhalf Michael Lynagh kicked 5 from 6. For the second and third tests, changes included Mike Teague, recovered from injury, at blindside flanker; Rob Andrew replacing Craig Chalmers at fly-half; and Jeremy Guscott and Scott Hastings coming into the centre positions. The team became the only Lions team ever to come from 1–0 down to win a series, winning the second test in Brisbane 19–12 and the third test in Sydney 19–18. The Lions completed their tour with a victory of a combined ANZAC team. Teague was named player of the series.

Results
Scores and results list Bristish Lions' points tally first.

Squad

Backs

Forwards

References

External links
1989 British Lions tour to Australia at ESPN
Article on the tour at Lionsrugby
1989 British Lions tour to Australia at Lions Tour History
1989 British Lions tour to Australia Squad where are they now

1989 rugby union tours
1989
1989 in Australian rugby union
1987–88 in British rugby union
1987–88 in Irish rugby union
1988–89 in Irish rugby union